Myanmar competed at the 2016 Summer Olympics in Rio de Janeiro, Brazil, from 5 to 21 August 2016. This was the nation's sixteenth appearance at the Olympics, although it had previous competed in most editions under the name Burma. Myanmar did not attend the 1976 Summer Olympics in Montreal for political reasons.

Myanmar Olympic Committee sent a team of seven athletes, four men and three women, to compete in five different sports at the Olympics. The nation's roster size was relatively larger by a single athlete than those sent to both Beijing 2008 and London 2012 with six each. Most of them were awarded places in their respective sporting events through wild card entries and Tripartite Commission invitations, with the exception of pistol shooter Ye Tun Naung, who qualified directly for the Games on merit. Half-heavyweight judoka Yan Naing Soe led the delegation as the nation's flag bearer in the opening ceremony.

Myanmar, however, has yet to win its first Olympic medal. San Yu Htwe, who arrived in Rio de Janeiro on a Tripartite Commission invitation, overwhelmed some of the highest-ranked archers in two elimination rounds to produce a best result for Myanmar at the Games, before falling short of the third round to South Korea's defending champion Ki Bo-bae.

Archery
 
Myanmar has received an invitation from the Tripartite Commission to send a female archer to the Olympic tournament.

Athletics

Myanmar has received universality slots from IAAF to send two athletes (one male and one female) to the Olympics.

Track & road events

Judo
 
Myanmar has received an invitation from the Tripartite Commission to send a judoka competing in the men's half-heavyweight category (100 kg) to the Olympics.

Shooting
 
Myanmar has qualified one shooter in the men's pistol events by virtue of Ye Tun Naung's performances in the 2015 ISSF World Cup series and Asian Championships, as long as he obtained a minimum qualifying score (MQS) by March 31, 2016.

Qualification Legend: Q = Qualify for the next round; q = Qualify for the bronze medal (shotgun)

Swimming

Myanmar have received a Universality invitation from FINA to send two swimmers (one male and one female) to the Olympics.

References

External links 
 

Nations at the 2016 Summer Olympics
2016
Olympics